Edward of Angoulême (27 January 1365 –  September 1370) was second in line to the throne of the Kingdom of England before his death. Born in Angoulême, he was the eldest child of Edward, Prince of Wales, commonly called "the Black Prince", and Joan, Countess of Kent, and thus was a member of the House of Plantagenet. Edward's birth, during the Hundred Years' War, was celebrated luxuriously by his father and by other monarchs, such as Charles V of France.

Edward died at the age of five, leaving his three-year-old brother, Richard of Bordeaux, as the new second in line. After the Black Prince's death in 1376, Richard became heir apparent to Edward III and succeeded the following year. Richard later ordered a monument to be made for his brother's tomb, which he had re-located; he also possibly depicted his brother on the Wilton Diptych.

Life

Birth 

Edward was born at the Château d'Angoulême, in Angoulême, then part of the Duchy of Aquitaine. His name, Edward of Angoulême, is a territorial designation referring to his birthplace; this was a common naming practice in 14th-century England. Through his father, Edward the Black Prince, he was a member of the House of Plantagenet and the second, but eldest surviving grandson of the reigning English monarch, Edward III. Edward was related to the reigning French royal House of Valois through his paternal grandmother, Philippa of Hainault. His mother, Joan, was his father's first cousin once removed, and was suo jure Countess of Kent.

Edward's date of birth has been a matter of debate. In the Dictionary of National Biography article for his father, Edward's birth year is given as 1363, 1364 or 1365, based on three contemporary chronicles, including that of Jean Froissart. A letter sent by Joan of Kent to Edward III on 4 February 1365 announces Edward's birth on 27 January; therefore, this is the date of birth most used. News of his birth was "so acceptable to his royal grandfather, that the king conferred upon the messenger, John Delves, an annuity of forty pounds per annum for life."

Edward was baptized at the Château d'Angoulême, in March 1365. The Black Prince enjoyed luxury and Edward's baptism was meant to show the natives of Aquitaine that they had a sovereign in the Black Prince: present were 154 lords and 706 knights and, supposedly, 18000 horses; over £400 were spent on candles alone. Edward's baptism was also celebrated with "splendid tournaments." One of his godparents was Bishop Jean de Crois. The name the Black Prince chose for his eldest son had been borne by three English kings and had already become a popular name with political implications by the time Edward and his brother, Richard (b. 1367), were born. In Yorkist times, these were the most popular names.

Death 

After prolonged suffering, Edward died of the bubonic plague; although the exact time of his death is not known, the date of January 1371 is commonly used. The Wigmore Chronicle  of 1370 states that Edward died "around the feast of Saint Michael [29 September]"; this is probably the correct date.

The Black Prince found out about Edward's death after he returned from the siege of Limoges; "he was very grieved in his heart, but none can escape death." Edward's loss "was a bitter grief to [the Black Prince and Joan of Kent]" and only increased the severity of the Black Prince's illness. Edward had "already won a reputation for a Christ-like character," and in his infancy, "historians have been willing to see the seeds of those high qualities which distinguished his father and his grandfather, which were denied to his brother Richard II." The Black Prince returned to England with Joan and Richard in 1371, and died there in 1376 of a wasting disease that had been ravaging his body for many years.

Before the Black Prince and his family left for England,  he left his brother, John of Gaunt, in charge of arranging Edward's funeral, which took place in Bordeaux and was attended by all of the barons of Gascony and Poitou. Edward's body was exhumed in 1388/9 and transported back to England by Robert Waldby, Bishop of Aire, who was acting under Richard II's orders. It was at this time that Edward was buried at "Chilterne Langley," also known as Children's Langley, a priory on the estate of Kings Langley. Between 1540 and 1607, the church at Kings Langley was ruined; and Edward had already been re-buried at the Church of the Austin Friars by 1598.

While Richard could not have remembered Edward well, he still "recalled [his brother] with pious affection." Thus, Edward is possibly featured on the Wilton Diptych, a small diptych which depicts Richard kneeling before the Virgin (possibly represented by Joan of Kent) and Child (possibly represented by Edward). The Diptych is held at the National Gallery of London.

Legacy 

Edward's early demise caused great pain to both Richard and his parents: historian Alison Weir states that, from the time the Black Prince returned to England after Edward's death, "he was a broken man." Edward's death also had a substantial impact on English history. Even during Edward's lifetime, fears that John of Gaunt would claim the throne existed; Parliament passed the Act of 1368, which permitted children born in the English domains in France to inherit the Kingdom of England, perhaps fearing that the Act of 1351, which established Edward and Richard's citizenship as English, would not be enough to ensure their succession. After Edward III's death and Richard's ascension, a regency led by John of Gaunt was avoided. Nonetheless, Gaunt maintained his influential position in the years that followed, and acted as de facto regent until January 1380.

Although Richard was only ten years old when he began his reign, towards the end of the 1390s, he began what historians consider to be a period of "tyranny". By the time of Edward's death, England was in the midst of fighting during the Hundred Years' War, which had been started by Edward III. Richard made efforts to end the war, but was unsuccessful due to opposition from his magnates and the French refusing to formally acknowledge their territorial losses by transferring land to the English. In 1399, Richard was imprisoned in the Tower of London and abdicated in favour of his cousin, the Earl of Derby. With Richard's death on 14 February 1400, the direct line of the House of Plantagenet was brought to an end.

Ancestry

Endnotes

Footnotes

Bibliography 

 
 
 
 
 
 
 
 
 
 
 
 
 
 
 
 
 
 
 
 
 
 
 
 
 
 
 
 
 
 
 
 
 
 
 
 
 
 

1365 births
1370 deaths
English people of French descent
English people of Belgian descent
English people of Spanish descent
14th-century deaths from plague (disease)
House of Plantagenet
Burials at Austin Friars, London
Children of Edward the Black Prince
Royalty and nobility who died as children